Mario Marzi (born 29 July 1964) is a saxophonist.  He was born in San Giovanni in Marignano, Italy. He has abandoned Italian citizenship in favor of San Marino citizenship.
His image appeared on the covers of Audiophile (Italy) and The Sax (Japan).

Discography 

 2011 East Travel Antonio Carlos Jobim
 2010 10 Anni Dopo Franco Donatoni
 2010  Piano Car Stefano Ianne
 2009 Piazzolla Four Seasons of Buenos Aires Piazzolla, Troilo, Iturralde, Gershwin
 2009 The Art of Saxophone Glazunov, Debussy, Ibert, Milhaud, Villa-Lobos
 2008 Milonga Del Angel Nazaret, Gismonti, Zanchini, Pascoal, Corea
 2005 La Voce Del Sax Amadeus (prima italiana assoluta)Glazunov, Debussy, Ibert, Milhaud, Villa-Lobos
 2005 Nonostante Tutto Cocomazzi
 2004 The Sound of the Italian Saxophone Quartet Live concert in Verona Scarlatti/Pierné, Bach,Francaix, Iturralde, Piazzolla,  Troilo, Joplin, Gershwin, Nagle, Rota, Nyman
 2003 Saxophone Colours Italian & French music for saxophone and piano Sollima, Salvatore, Dulbecco, Galante, Del Corno, Andreoni,  Ferrero, Boccadoro, Ibert, Jolivet, Milhaud, Debussy, Francaix, Schmitt, Desenclos
 2003 Ensemble Strumentale Scaligero Gershwin, Corea, Iturralde, Piazzolla
 2003 L'Arte del Funambolo Sollima, Salvatore, Dulbecco, Galante, Del Corno, Andreoni, Ferrero, Boccadoro
 2003 Rapsodie Francaise Ibert, Jolivet, Milhaud, Debussy, Francaix, Schmitt, Desenclos
 2003 Tango y ALso Mas Nazaret, Gismonti, Zanchini, Pascoal, Corea
 2003 Georg Gershwin Gershwin
 2000 Histoire Tango Piazzolla
 2000 Dedicated to Astor Piazzola Piazzolla
 1999 Scaramouch Milhaud, Jolivet, Ibert, Debussy, Francaix, Schmitt, Desenclos
 1999 Hello, Mr. Sax Monteverdi, Haendel, Vivaldi, Brahms, Alessandrini, Gershwin, Piazzolla, Corea
 1998 Astor Piazzola Piazzolla, Gismonti
 1998 Ensemble Italiano di Sassofoni Billi, De Rossi Re, Masini, Nicolao, Prosperi, Sallustio, Telli
 1997 Suite for Friends Cocomazzi

Publications 

 Il Saxofono. Zecchini Editore, 2009

References

External links 

 
 
 
 
 
 
 
 Media spa
 
 Italian Saxophone Quartet
 Mario Marzi on AllMusic

Living people
1964 births
Italian saxophonists
Male saxophonists
Italian classical musicians
21st-century saxophonists
21st-century Italian male musicians